is a Japanese football player. She plays for Chifure AS Elfen Saitama. She played for the Japanese national team.

Club career
Yamamoto was born in Miura on 9 March 1982. After graduating from high school, she joined Tasaki Perule FC in 2000. She was selected Best Young Player awards in 2000 season. The club won L.League championship in 2003 and 2nd position 4 times. However, the club was disbanded in 2008 due to financial strain. From 2009, she went to the United States and Italy. In 2014, she returned to Japan and joined Yokohama FC Seagulls (later NHK Spring Yokohama FC Seagulls).

National team career
On 12 January 2003, Yamamoto debuted for the Japanese national team against the United States. She played at the 2003 AFC Championship. She was also a team member for Japan at the 2003 World Cup and 2004 Summer Olympics. She played 22 games and scored 4 goals for Japan until 2004.

National team statistics

International goals

References

External links

 Scoresway
 ussoccer.com
 Japan Times
 Japan Times

1982 births
Living people
People from Miura, Kanagawa
Association football people from Kanagawa Prefecture
Japanese women's footballers
Japan women's international footballers
Nadeshiko League players
Tasaki Perule FC players
Nippatsu Yokohama FC Seagulls players
2003 FIFA Women's World Cup players
Olympic footballers of Japan
Footballers at the 2004 Summer Olympics
Women's association football midfielders